Top-seeded Steffi Graf claimed the title and $38,000 prize money by defeating Gabriela Sabatini in the final, after saving one match point.

Seeds
The top eight seeds received a bye into the second round. A champion seed is indicated in bold text while text in italics indicates the round in which that seed was eliminated.

  Steffi Graf (champion)
  Manuela Maleeva (semifinals)
  Gabriela Sabatini (final)
  Kathy Jordan (second round)
  Terry Phelps (quarterfinals)
  Kate Gompert (third round)
  Robin White (quarterfinals)
  Sandra Cecchini (second round)
  Helen Kelesi (third round)
  Ann Henricksson (first round)
  Debbie Spence (third round)
  Anna Ivan (first round)
  Elizabeth Smylie (first round)
  Molly Van Nostrand (first round)

Draw

Finals

Top half

Section 1

Section 2

Bottom half

Section 3

Section 4

References

External links

1986 Virginia Slims World Championship Series
Women's Singles